Miles Adam Sanders (born May 1, 1997), nicknamed "Boobie Miles", is an American football running back for the Carolina Panthers of the National Football League (NFL). He was drafted by the Philadelphia Eagles in the second round of the 2019 NFL Draft after playing college football at Penn State.

Early years

Miles grew up in Swissvale, a borough nine miles east of downtown Pittsburgh, Pennsylvania, and attended local powerhouse Woodland Hills High School, where he was a three-year starter at running back. After winning Pennsylvania's Mr. Football award during his senior year and attending the Under Armour All-America Game, Sanders chose to attend Penn State over a host of other offers, including the local Pittsburgh Panthers.

College career

2016 season
Sanders saw a limited amount of playing time as a true freshman behind teammate Saquon Barkley. He received the majority of his reps on special teams this season. While returning kicks for Penn State, Sanders set the school record for kicks returned in a season (33). He is also ranked second on the program's list for kick return yards in a single season (688), averaging 20.8 yards per return.

Sanders was selected as a BTN.com All-Big Ten Freshman Team honorable mention.

2017 season
In 2017, Sanders played in 12 games, making his first college start in one of them. He started his first game against Rutgers on November 11, 2017. Sanders was presented with the 2018 Red Worrell Award, for the offensive player who best demonstrated exemplary conduct, loyalty, interest, attitude and improvement during spring practice.

2018 season
With Barkley’s departure from Penn State after the 2017 season, Sanders was named Penn State's starting running back. Sanders started all 13 games in the 2018 season. On September 1, in his junior season debut against Appalachian State, he carried the ball 19 times, rushing for 91 yards and two touchdowns. That also included the game-winning 4-yard touchdown in overtime. After this performance, he was named the coaching staff's Offensive Player of the Week. Sanders’ most notable game of the year came against Illinois on September 21. He rushed for a career-best 200 yards on 22 carries. He also ended the game with a career-high three rushing touchdowns. He was then named the Big Ten Co-Offensive Player of the Week.

To end the season, Sanders finished No. 2 in the Big Ten and No. 15 in the nation with 1,274 rushing yards, was ranked No. 4 in the conference and No. 25 in the FBS with 98.0 rushing yards per game, and was No. 5 in the Big Ten and No. 40 in the nation with 5.79 yards per carry. Additionally, he finished seventh in the Big Ten in rushing touchdowns (9) and all-purpose yards per game (108.7). On January 3, 2019, Sanders decided to declare for the NFL Draft and forgo his senior season of college football.

College statistics

Awards and accolades
 BTN.com All-Big Ten Freshman Team honorable mention
 2018 Red Worrell Award
 Selected second-team All-Big Ten by the league's coaches and media
 Second-team All-Big Ten honors by Associated Press
 Penn State Most Valuable Offensive Player
 Big Ten Offensive Player of the Week after Illinois (9/21) game
 Member of the Maxwell Award Watch List
 Preseason watch list for the Doak Walker Award, given to the nation's top running back

Professional career

Philadelphia Eagles
Sanders was drafted by the Philadelphia Eagles in the second round (53rd overall pick) in the 2019 NFL Draft. He is represented by Beyond Athlete Management.

2019

Sanders made his NFL debut in Week 1 against the Washington Redskins. In the game, Sanders rushed 11 times for 25 yards as the Eagles won 32–27. In Week 6 against the Minnesota Vikings, Sanders rushed three times for six yards and caught three passes for 86 yards and a touchdown. In a Week 15 game against the Redskins, Sanders rushed 19 times for 122 yards and a touchdown and caught six passes for 50 yards and another touchdown in a 37–27 win.  During the game, Sanders passed LeSean McCoy and DeSean Jackson for the most rushing yards by a rookie and the most all-purpose yards by a rookie in franchise history, respectively.  In Week 16 against the Dallas Cowboys, Sanders rushed 20 times for 79 yards and a touchdown and caught five passes for 77 yards.  He finished his rookie season with 818 rushing yards and three rushing touchdowns to go along with 50 receptions for 509 receiving yards and three receiving touchdowns.

In the NFC Wild Card Round against the Seattle Seahawks, Sanders rushed 14 times for 69 yards in a 17–9 loss.

2020
Sanders missed the first game of the 2020 regular season with a hamstring injury. He returned in Week 2 to make his season debut against the Los Angeles Rams. In the 37–19 loss, Sanders recorded 131 scrimmage yards and a rushing touchdown. In Week 5 against his hometown team, the Pittsburgh Steelers, Sanders rushed for 80 yards and two touchdowns, including a 74-yard score, during a 38–29 loss. In Week 6 against the Baltimore Ravens, he had nine carries for 118 yards. In Week 14, against the New Orleans Saints, he had fourteen carries for 115 yards and two touchdowns, including a career-high 82-yard score, during the 24–21 win. Sanders played in 12 games in the 2020 season. He finished with 164 carries for	867 rushing yards and six rushing touchdowns to go along with 28 receptions for 197 receiving yards. Following the season, Sanders, along with Clyde Edwards-Helaire were selected to the playable Pro Bowl roster of the Madden 21 Video Game Numbers Challenge.

2021

While Sanders started off as the team's feature back, the offense began to focus on passing the ball more, which led to Sanders spending more time on the bench. Through the first six games, Sanders had a combined total of 57 carries for 270 yards and no touchdowns. In the team's week 7 matchup against the Las Vegas Raiders, Sanders suffered a sprained ankle. This injury forced Sanders to miss three weeks of action. He returned in time for the team's week 11 showdown with the New Orleans Saints. Sanders stepped back into a large role in the week 13 game against the New York Jets, as he carried the ball a season high 24 times for 120 yards. In week 15 against the Washington Football Team, Sanders recorded a season high 131 yards rushing on 18 carries. His hot streak came to an end during the Eagles' week 16 matchup against the New York Giants, Sanders broke a bone in his hand, which forced him to miss the final two games of the regular season. In the 2021 season, Sanders recorded 137 carries for 754 rushing yards and 26 receptions for 158 yards across 12 games.

2022
In Week 4, Sanders ran for 134 yards and two touchdowns, helping the Eagles move to 4-0 on the season during a 29-21 win over the Jacksonville Jaguars. In Week 12, Sanders rushed for a then-season high 143 yards and two touchdowns on 21 carries in a 40-34 win over the Green Bay Packers and topped that two weeks later with 144 yards and two touchdowns on just 17 carries in a 48-22 win over the New York Giants. Sanders finished the 2022 season ranked among the league's top 10 in carries, rushing yards, and rushing touchdowns; his 1,269 yards were 5th most in the league, while his 259 carries and 11 touchdowns both ranked 8th.

Sanders rushed 17 times for 90 yards in the Eagles' 38-7 win over the New York Giants in the Divisional Round. In the NFC Championship Game against the San Francisco 49ers, Sanders rushed for two touchdowns in the 31-7 win. In Super Bowl LVII, Sanders had seven carries for 16 yards in the Eagles 38-35 loss to the Kansas City Chiefs.

Carolina Panthers
On March 15, 2023, Sanders signed a four-year, $25.4 million contract with the Carolina Panthers.

NFL career statistics

Regular season

Postseason

Philadelphia Eagles franchise records
 Most rushing yards by a rookie (818)
 Most yards from scrimmage by a rookie (1,327)
 Most all-purpose yards by a rookie (1,641)

References

External links

Twitter
Philadelphia Eagles bio
Penn State Nittany Lions bio

1997 births
Living people
American football running backs
Penn State Nittany Lions football players
Players of American football from Pennsylvania
Sportspeople from Pittsburgh
Philadelphia Eagles players
National Conference Pro Bowl players
Carolina Panthers players